Tony Schmidt (born July 20, 1988 in Dresden) is a German football player who plays for VSG Altglienicke.

Career
He played for Dynamo Dresden from 2008 to 2010, where he made his debut in the 3. Liga against Kickers Emden on February 7, 2009 as a substitute for Sascha Pfeffer.

Notes

External links

Tony Schmidt at Kicker
Tony Schmidt at Soccerway

1988 births
Living people
German footballers
Dynamo Dresden players
Hallescher FC players
TuS Koblenz players
3. Liga players
Regionalliga players
Association football midfielders
FSV Budissa Bautzen players
VSG Altglienicke players
Footballers from Dresden